Asparagus racemosus (satavar, shatavari, or shatamull, shatawari) is a species of asparagus native from Africa through southern Asia, including the Indian subcontinent, to northern Australia. It was botanically described in 1799. Because of its multiple uses, the demand for Asparagus racemosus is constantly on the rise. Due to destructive harvesting, combined with habitat destruction, and deforestation, the plant is now considered "endangered" in its natural habitat.

Description 

Asparagus racemosus is a climber having stems up to 4 m long. Its roots are both fibrous and tuberous.

Shatavari has small pine-needle-like phylloclades (photosynthetic branches) that are uniform and shiny green. In July, it produces minute, white flowers on short, spiky stems, and in September it fruits, producing blackish-purple, globular berries. It has an adventitious root system with tuberous roots that measure about one metre in length, tapering at both ends, with roughly a hundred on each plant.

Uses
Shatavari is used in Indian traditional medicine. Despite its long history of use in Ayurveda, no high-quality clinical evidence exists to support using shatavari as a therapy for any disease. Studies of its effects on lactation have shown mixed results. Its safety has not been well-studied, with two small trials finding no adverse effects in mothers or their babies. Constituents of shatavari include steroidal saponins, mucilage, and alkaloids.

Australian aboriginal uses 
The roots of Asparagus racemosa are boiled and give a liquid used as an external wash to treat colds and other sicknesses, by the aborigines of the Moyle River area in the Northern Territory. (The Ngan'gi name for the plant is yerrwuwu.)

Chemical constituents
Asparagamine A, a polycyclic alkaloid was isolated from the dried roots and subsequently synthesized to allow for the construction of analogs.

Steroidal saponins, shatavaroside A, shatavaroside B, filiasparoside C, shatavarins, immunoside, and schidigerasaponin D5 (or asparanin A) were isolated from the roots of Asparagus racemosus.

Also known is the isoflavone 8-methoxy-5,6,4'-trihydroxyisoflavone 7-O-β-D-glucopyranoside.

See also
 Shatavar Vatika Herbal Park, Hisar, Haryana—a herbal park in India for the research, preservation and production of Ayurveda products, including shatavari

References

External links

 Picture of A. racemosus flowers from "Flowers of India" website

racemosus
Flora of Africa
Flora of Australia
Flora of Cambodia
Flora of Java
Flora of Madagascar
Flora of Malaya
Flora of Myanmar
Flora of Oman
Flora of Thailand
Flora of the Indian subcontinent
Flora of the Lesser Sunda Islands
Flora of the Maluku Islands
Flora of Tibet
Flora of Vietnam
Flora of Yemen
Plants described in 1799
Plants used in Ayurveda